Keirsten Alley (born September 17, 1973) is an American former professional tennis player.

Alley, who comes from Melrose, Massachusetts, played college tennis for UC Berkeley. A four-time All-American, she won two Pac-10 doubles championships partnering Pam Nelson and with the same player was an NCAA doubles semi-finalist in 1995.

From 1995 to 1997, Alley competed on the professional tour and reached a best singles ranking of 276, winning ITF titles in Curaçao and Santo Domingo. As a doubles player she made a WTA Tour main draw appearance at the 1997 Stanford Classic with Laxmi Poruri.

ITF finals

Singles: 5 (2–3)

Doubles: 9 (3–6)

References

External links
 
 

1973 births
Living people
American female tennis players
People from Melrose, Massachusetts
Sportspeople from Middlesex County, Massachusetts
Tennis people from Massachusetts
California Golden Bears women's tennis players